The Turkey men's national field hockey team represents Turkey in men's international field hockey competitions and is controlled by the Turkish Hockey Federation.

So far, Turkey has only competed in the Men's EuroHockey Championship III and EuroHockey Championship IV of the EuroHockey Nations Challenge, with their best ever result being 3rd in the 2021 Championship III and 1st in the 2011 Championship IV.

Tournament record

EuroHockey Championship III
2013 – 7th place
2015 – 5th place
2017 – 4th place
2019 – 5th place
2021 –

EuroHockey Championship IV
2007 – 
2011 –

Hockey World League
2012–13 – Round 1
2014–15 – Round 1
2016–17 – Round 1

FIH Hockey Series
2018–19 – First round

See also
 Turkey women's national field hockey team

References

European men's national field hockey teams
National team
Field hockey
Field hockey